The 1954 season was the Chicago Bears' 35th in the National Football League. The team improved on their 3–8–1 record from 1953 and finished at 8–4 under head coach and owner George Halas, runner-up in the Western Conference.

Regular season

Schedule

Standings

References 

Chicago Bears
Chicago Bears seasons
Chicago Bears